The 2015 Yas Marina GP2 Series round was a GP2 Series motor race held on November 28 and 29, 2015 at Yas Marina Circuit, Abu Dhabi. It was the final showdown of the 2015 GP2 Series. The race supported the 2015 Abu Dhabi Grand Prix.

Classification

Qualifying

Feature race

Sprint race
After the start, in turn two, Pierre Gasly spun, as a result of which several drivers Sean Gelael, Daniël de Jong, Artem Markelov, Nicholas Latifi and Norman Nato collided in the wall. However, the tech-pro wall could not be restored in time, so the race had to be cancelled.

See also 
 2015 Abu Dhabi Grand Prix
 2015 Yas Marina GP3 Series round

References

Yas Marina
GP2
Yas Marina